Coryanthes picturata is a species of orchid found in Belize, Costa Rica, Guatemala, Honduras, Mexico, Nicaragua and Panama.

References

External links

picturata
Orchids of Central America
Orchids of Belize
Orchids of Mexico
Plants described in 1864